Belyando is a rural locality in the Isaac Region, Queensland, Australia. In the  Belyando had a population of 66 people.

Geography 
The Belyando River passes through the locality from south to north, being fed by a number of tributary creeks. The Belyando River feeds into the Suttor River and then into the Burdekin River which flows into the Coral Sea.

The Gregory Developmental Road passes through the locality from the north-east to the south-east; the Bowen Developmental Road enters the locality from the north-east and has its junction with the Gregory Developmental Road in the north-east of the locality. This junction is known as the Belyando Crossing.

The Nairana National Park is in the north-east of the locality and the Wilandspey Conservation Park in the north of the locality.

History 
The locality names presumably derives from the Belyando River, where Belyando is believed to an Aboriginal word recorded by explorer and surveyor Thomas Mitchell, where "baal" means "no" and "yan" means "go", spoken by an Aboriginal man trying to stop Mitchell proceeding farther north.

In the  Belyando had a population of 66 people.

References

External links 

Isaac Region
Localities in Queensland